Wyoming Highway 433 (WYO 433) is a  Wyoming state road in Washakie and Big Horn counties.

Route description
Wyoming Highway 433 begins its southern end at US 20/WYO 789 on the west side of Worland in Washakie County. Here WYO 433 passes through a lightly built up section of Worland before crossing the Bighorn Canal and entering a more rural landscape which dominates for the remainder of its routing. Highway 433 travels north along the west side of the Bighorn River, closely following the Bighorn canal, and reaches the community (CDP) of West River at approximately 6 miles. Highway 433 also parallels US 16/US 20/WYO 789 that runs along the east side of the Bighorn River and acts as an alternate to that routing north to Manderson where it meets up with those routes. At approximately 10.9 miles, WYO 433 leaves Washakie County and enters Big Horn County. Highway 433 gently meanders north-northwest and reaches its northern end just west of Manderson at Highway 16/20/789 after 18.81 miles.

Major intersections

References

External links 

Wyoming State Routes 400-499
WYO 433 - US 20/WYO 789 to US 16/US 20/WYO 789

Transportation in Washakie County, Wyoming
Transportation in Big Horn County, Wyoming
433